The Salmon Glacier is a glacier located ~ north of Stewart, British Columbia, and Hyder, Alaska, just on the Canadian side of the border. The glacier, one of hundreds in the Boundary Ranges, is notable for its major potential as a natural hazard. Summit Lake is located at the northern end of the glacier and every year around mid-July the lake breaks an ice-dam and then flows under the Salmon Glacier into the Salmon River.

The glacier can be accessed by road from Hyder, Alaska, from early July to late September.

The glacier's name was officially adopted January 20, 1955, by the Geographical Names Board of Canada.

Climate
Based on the Köppen climate classification, Salmon Glacier is located in the marine west coast climate zone of western North America. Most weather fronts originate in the Pacific Ocean, and travel east toward the Coast Mountains where they are forced upward by the range (Orographic lift), causing them to drop their moisture in the form of rain or snowfall. As a result, the Coast Mountains experience high precipitation, especially during the winter months in the form of snowfall. Temperatures can drop below  with wind chill factors below .

See also
List of glaciers
Hyder, Alaska
Stewart, British Columbia

References

External links
 
 Google Map photo of the Salmon Glacier
 Flickr: Salmon Glacier and Mt. Bayard
 Weather: Salmon Glacier
 YouTube: Mt. Bayard seen from road

Further reading

 Haumann, Dieter, 1960, Photogrammetric and glaciological studies of Salmon Glacier: Arctic, v. 13, no. 2, p. 74–100
 Clark, K.C., and Holdsworth, G., 2002, U.S. Geological Survey Professional Paper 1386-J: Satellite Image Atlas of Glaciers of the World -- North America, p. 291-299

Glaciers of British Columbia
Boundary Ranges
Natural hazards in British Columbia
Stewart Country